is a Japanese singer-songwriter, reporter, and radio personality. Since the start of her professional singing career in 1980, Sawada has recorded over 27 studio albums.

Life and career
At the age of five, Sawada became a member of the Otowa Basket Lily Association and started singing nursery rhymes and appeared as a child actor. She appeared in a TV commercial for "Panshiron" sponsored by Rohto Pharmaceutical Co. in 1968, alongside Kiyoshi Atsumi.

On May 25, 1979, Sawada released "Campus Sketch", her recording debut with Crown Record. At that time, young female singer-songwriters were rare in Japan, but she benefited from her Japanese idol good looks and attracted a male audience. Many of the songs she performed were not written by Sawada. She also struggled to make love songs.

Sawada also gained popularity via NHK-FM's radio program "Requests". In October 1989, she hosted the KBS Kyoto radio program "Hyper Night" every Thursday. Guests on the program included Tarako and Airi Hiramatsu. She also wrote and composed the song "Shin'ai naru Hitoe" (lit. "To the Dear Person") in memory of Kōzō Murashita who died in 1999.

Sawada released album History 2 on October 21, 2004, to commemorate her 25th anniversary as a recording artist. She has performed in the  "Furano Chapel Concert" at Shin-Furano Prince Hotel for a few days every winter. She has been in the group "The 4/9" with Reiko Sada, the sister of Masashi Sada, since 2005.

Sawada is a radio personality on Yamanashi Broadcasting System's "Jamboree Saturday of Sawada Seiko". She has also hosted "Paradise afternoon – Subete ni Arigato" every Monday at the Japanese FM's community radio Music Bird.

Discography

Singles

Albums

Compilations 
 Best Selection 1979–1983 (1984)
 For You (1985.08.21)
 17 Songs Sawada Masako Part I, II (1987)
 History (1998)
 Sawada Seiko Artist Series Collection (1999)
 History 2 (2004)

External links
 
 Blog

1962 births
Living people
Anime composers
Anime musicians
Anime singers
Japanese women composers
Japanese women pop singers
Japanese women singer-songwriters
Japanese guitarists
Japanese radio personalities
Japanese reporters and correspondents
Japanese women pianists
Japanese women record producers
Musicians from Tokyo
People from Nakano, Tokyo
20th-century Japanese women singers
20th-century Japanese singers
21st-century Japanese women singers
21st-century Japanese singers
20th-century women composers
21st-century women composers
20th-century women pianists
21st-century women pianists